Libertarian Movement may refer to one of the following subjects:

 Libertarian Movement (Costa Rica)
 Libertarian movement in the United States, see Libertarianism in the United States
 Libertarian migration movement to New Hampshire, see Free State Project